The 1923 Maryland gubernatorial election was held on November 6, 1923. Incumbent Democrat Albert Ritchie defeated Republican nominee Alexander Armstrong with 55.97% of the vote.

General election

Candidates
Major party candidates
Albert Ritchie, Democratic
Alexander Armstrong, Republican 

Other candidates
William H. Champlin, Socialist
Verne L. Reynolds, Independent

Results

References

1923
Maryland
Gubernatorial